The International Accounting Education Standards Board (IAESB) is  an independent organisation within the fold of the International Federation of Accountants (IFAC). The board develops guidance to improve standards of education in accountancy.
The two main areas of focus are the key elements of accreditation and the requirements of accountants for continuing professional education.
The board also sponsors studies or papers about accounting education that promote discussion and debate on accounting education and development issues.

Organization

Members of the board may be nominated by IFAC member bodies or by IFAC's Transnational Auditors Committee. 
Public members may be nominated by member bodies, the TAC, other organizations and the general public.
The International Association for Accounting Education & Research (IAAER) has an observer of the board.
An IAAER research program funded by the Association of Chartered Certified Accountants (ACCA) creates research reports that inform the IAESB.
The IAESB is subject to the oversight of the Public Interest Oversight Board (PIOB).

Publications

In January 2010 the IAESB released its Framework for International Education Standards for Professional Accountants.
This paper defines the underlying educational concepts of the IAESB standards, describes the IAESB publications, and affirms the obligations of IFAC member bodies relating to accounting education.
The IAESB periodically updates standards.
In March 2010 the IAESB asked for comments on a proposed revision to the International Education Standard that defined Competence Requirements for Audit Professionals. This is one of the eight standards that address the principles of learning and development for professional accountants.
The IAESB  strongly encouraged organizations and individuals to comment on proposed revisions.
In May 2011 the IAESB released a proposed revision of International Education Standard for Assessment of Professional Competence, requesting comments.

References

International accounting organizations